Route 85 is a north–south state highway in the east-central portion of the U.S. state of Connecticut linking the city of New London to the town of Bolton.

The section of Route 85 between Route 82 in Salem and Interstate 95 (I-95) in Waterford is a major thoroughfare that serves traffic between the Hartford and New London areas. This section travels through what is known as the Route 11 Corridor, named for the unfinished expressway that was to run parallel to Route 85 in this area. Currently, the Route 11 expressway ends abruptly in Salem, and all traffic is forced to exit and directed onto Route 85 (via Route 82).

Route description
Route 85 begins as a four-lane urban arterial road at U.S. Route 1 (US 1) in New London, with junctions with I-95 and I-395 in Waterford. Route 85 continues north through the towns of Montville and Salem as a 2-lane rural arterial road up to the junction with Route 82. The road continues further north into the towns of Colchester, Hebron, and Bolton as a collector road (with arterial sections near the Route 2 and Route 16 junctions). There is a brief concurrency with Route 16 in Colchester.  Route 85 ends in Bolton at US 6 and US 44 with a partial interchange with I-384 just before its terminus.

History
The section of Route 85 south of Colchester can be traced to the 19th century Hartford and New London Turnpike (also called Governor's Road) This portion of the former turnpike was designated as State Highway 102 in 1922, when state highways were first signed in Connecticut. The northward continuation from Colchester to Hebron was assigned as State Highway 366. Modern Route 85 was established in the 1932 state highway renumbering from old Highways 102 and 366, with an extension north via Bolton center to Route 83 in Manchester (using Campmeeting Road and Charter Oak Street).  In 1950, the northern terminus was moved to its current location at US 6 (along former SR 807). The northern terminus was moved back to its original location in 1954, then shifted again to its current location in 1963. The original northern end became SR 534.

Junction list

References

External links

085
Transportation in New London County, Connecticut
Transportation in Tolland County, Connecticut